This is a list of feature-length theatrical films produced and released by the Filipino motion picture company Viva Films since its foundation in 1981.

All films listed are theatrical releases and/or Filipino-based films unless specified.

 Films labeled with a ‡ symbol signify a direct-to-video or streaming release exclusively through Vivamax or Viva Prime
 A † symbol signifies a premium video on demand release through Vivamax or Viva Prime
 A * symbol signifies third party releases

1980s

P.S. I Love You (1981)
Sinasamba Kita (1982)
My Only Love (1982)
Forgive and Forget (1982)
Cross My Heart (1982)
Gaano Kadalas ang Minsan? (1982)
Friends in Love (1983)
Palabra de Honor (1983)
Sana Bukas pa ang Kahapon (1983)
Paano Ba ang Mangarap? (1983)
To Love Again (1983)
Saan Darating ang Umaga (1983)
Init sa Magdamag (1983)
Minsan Pa Nating Hagkan ang Nakaraan (1983)
Dugong Buhay (1983)
Laruan (1983)
Bago Kumalat ang Kamandag (1983)
Kung Mahawi Man ang Ulap (1984)
Bagets (1984)
Dapat Ka Bang Mahalin? (1984)
Working Girls (1984)
Bukas Luluhod ang Mga Tala (1984)
Somewhere (1984)
Hotshots (1984)
Mga Batang Yagit (1984)
Baby Tsina (1984)
May Daga sa Labas ng Lungga (1984)
Bagets 2 (1984)
Sa Hirap at Ginhawa (1984)
Kapag Puso'y Sinugatan (1985)
Working Boys (1985)
Bituing Walang Ningning (1985)
Sa Totoo Lang! (1985)
Isla (1985)
Ma'am May We Go Out? (1985)
Muling Buksan ang Puso (1985)
Beloved (1985)
Pati Ba Pintig ng Puso? (1985)
Like Father, Like Son (1985)
Tinik sa Dibdib (1985)
Doctor Doctor We Are Sick (1985)
Kailan Sasabihing Mahal Kita (1985)
Binhi (1985)
Bala Ko ang Hahatol (1985)
Kailan Ba Tama ang Mali? (1986)
Kamagong (1986)
Send in the Clowns (1986)
Palimos ng Pag-Ibig (1986)
Ninja Kids and the Samurai Sword (1986)
Bukas, Uulan ang Bala (1986)
Sana'y Wala Nang Wakas (1986)
Magdusa Ka (1986)
Nakagapos na Puso (1986)
Gabi Na, Kumander (1986)
Captain Barbell (1986)

1987

1988

1989

1990s
Tootsie Wootsie: Ang Bandang Walang Altrasan (1990)
Pangarap na Ginto (1990)
Kahit Konting Pagtingin (1990)
Sa Diyos Lang Ako Susuko (1990)
Kapag Wala Nang Batas (1990)
Hulihin Si... Boy Amores (1990)
Kakampi Ko ang Diyos (1990)
Gumapang Ka Sa Lusak (1990)
Paikot-Ikot (1990)
Sgt. Miguel Carpio: Multiple Murder (1990)
Jabidah Massacre (1990)
Titser's Enemi No. 1 (1990)
Kasalanan Bang Sambahin Ka? (1990)
Bikining Itim (1990)
Kolehiyala (1990)
Rocky n Rolly: Suntok Sabay Takbo (1990)
Walang Awa Kung Pumatay (1990)
Hulihin Si... Nardong Toothpick (1990)
Lumaban Ka, Sagot Kita (1990)
Bad Boy (1990)
Bakit Kay Tagal ng Sandali? (1990)
Anak ni Baby Ama (1990)
Bakit Ikaw Pa Rin? (1990)
Love at First Sight (1990)
Wooly Booly II: Ang Titser Kong Alien (1990)
Iputok mo... Dadapa ako! (Hard to Die) (co-production with OctoArts Films, 1990)
Biktima (1990)
Ang Utol Kong Hoodlum (1991)
Maging Sino Ka Man (1991)
Humanap Ka ng Panget (1991)
Sa Kabila ng Lahat (1991)
Hinakay Ko Na ang Libigan Mo (1991)
Boyong Mañalac: Hoodlum Terminator (1991)
Andrew Ford Medina: Wag Kang Gamol (1991)
Noel Juico: Batang Kriminal (1991)
Ipagpatawad Mo (1991)
Robin Good: Sugod ng Sugod (1991)
Huwag Mong Salingin ang Sugat Ko (1991)
Kaputol ng Isang Awit (1991)
Kumukulong Dugo (1991)
Angelito San Miguel: Ang Batang City Jail (1991)
Darna (1991)
Moro (1991)
Una Kang Naging Akin (1991)
Pitong Gamol (1991)
Miss na Miss Kita: Ang Utol Kong Hoodlum II (1992)
Pat Omar Abdullah: Pulis Probinsya (1992; distribution only, produced by Moviestars Productions)
Akin ang Pangarap Mo (1992)
Pangako sa 'Yo (1992)
Magnong Rehas (1992)
Alabang Girls (1992)
Mandurugas (1992)
Tayong Dalawa (1992)
Hiram na Mukha (1992)
Tag-Araw, Tag-Ulan (1992)
Mahirap Maging Pogi (1992)
Jesus Dela Cruz at ang Mga Batang Riles (1992)
Andres Manambit: Angkan ng Matatapang (1992)
Narito ang Puso Ko (1992)
Grease Gun Gang (1992)
Apoy sa Puso (1992)
Ngayon at Kailanman (1992)
Bad Boy II (1992)
Dillinger (1992)
Ang Boyfriend Kong Gamol (1993)
Pretty Boy (1993)
Sana'y Ikaw Na Nga (1993)
Makuha Ka sa Tingin (1993)
Pita: Terror ng Caloocan (1993)
Kapag Iginuhit ang Hatol ng Puso (1993)
Gagay: Prinsesa ng Brownout (1993)
Hanggang Saan Hanggang Kailan (1993)
Kung Kailangan Mo Ako (1993)
Anak ng Pasig (1993)
Markadong Hudas (1993)
Kahit Ako'y Busabos (1993)
Row 4: Baliktorians (1993)
Ikaw (1993)
Sala sa Init, Sala sa Lamig (1993)
Paranaque Bank Robbery: The Joselito Joseco Story (1993)
Dodong Armado (1993)
Astig (1993)
Manchichiritchit: Aanga-Anga sa Maynila (1993)
Di na Natuto (Sorry Na, Puede Ba?) (1993)
Sa Isang Sulok ng Mga Pangarap (1993)
Pusoy Dos (1993)
Mistah (1994)
Hindi Pa Tapos ang Laban (1994)
Kapantay Ay Langit (1994)
Pinagbiyak ng Bunga: Lookalayk (1994)
Ultimatum (1994)
Baby Paterno (Dugong Pulis) (1994)
The Cecilla Masagca Story: Antipolo Massacre (Jesus Save Us!) (1994)
Kadenang Bulaklak (1994)
Pangako ng Kahapon (1994)
Da Young Asyong Aksaya (1994)
Ikaw ang Miss Universe ng Buhay Ko (1994)
Brat Pack (1994)
Mars Ravelo's Darna! Ang Pagbabalik (1994)
The Untold Story: Vizconde Massacre II - May the Lord Be with Us! (1994) 
Ober Da Bakod: The Movie (1994)
The Maggie dela Riva Story: God... Why Me? (1994)
Kalabog en Bosyo (1994)
Cuadro de Jack (1994)
Sana Dalawa ang Puso Ko (1994)
Megamol (1994)
Pintsik (1994)
Oo Na, Sige Na (1994)
Col. Billy Bibit, RAM (1994)
Forever (1994)
Marami Ka Pang Kakaining Bigas (1994)
Si Ayala at Si Zobel (1994; co-production with OctoArts Films)
Lipa 'Arandia' Massacre: Lord, Deliver Us from Evil (1994)
Talahib at Rosas (1994)
Anghel Na Walang Langit (1994)
Epimaco Velasco: NBI (co-production with FLT Films & FPJ Productions, 1994)
Ang Pagbabalik ni Pedro Penduko (1994)
Lucas Abelardo (1994; co-production with Levin Films)
Anabelle Huggins Story: Ruben Ablaza Tragedy - Mea Culpa (1995)
Campus Girls (1995)
The Lilian Velez Story: Till Death Do Us Part (1995)
Ang Tipo Kong Lalake (1995)
P're Hanggang Sa Huli (1995)
Love Notes (1995)
Bikini Watch (1995)
Silakbo (1995)
Epifanio ang Bilas Ko (1995)
Iligpit si Bobby Ortega, Markang Bungo 2 (1995)
Batangueno Kabitenyo (1995)
I Love You Sabado (1995)
Minsan May Pangarap (1995)
Bangers (1995)
The Flor Contemplacion Story (1995)
Jessica Alfaro Story (1995)
The Grepor Butch Belgica Story (1995)
Urban Rangers (1995)
Dobol Trobol  (1995; released under the Falcon Films label)
Okey si Ma'am (1995)
Rodolfo 'Boy' Fuentes: Libingan ng Mga Buhay (1995)
Batas Ko ang Katapat Mo (1995)
Judge Max Asuncion: Hukom Bitay (1995)
Minsan Pa: Kahit Konting Pagtingin Part 2 (1995)
Indecent Professor (1995; released under the Falcon Films label)
Manalo, Matalo, Mahal Kita (1995; released under the Neo Films label)
Huwag Mong Isuko Ang Laban (1995; distribution only, produced by Rockets Productions)
Sabado Nights (1995; released under the Neo Films label)
Muling Umawit ang Puso (1995)
Dyesebel (1996)
Ober Da Bakod 2: Da Treasure Adbentyur (1996 released under the Neo Films label)
Sa Kamay ng Batas (1996)
Tong-its (1996; released under the Neo Films label)
Ang Pinakamagandang Hayop sa Balat ng Lupa (1996)
Hindi Lahat ng Ahas ay Nasa Gubat (1996)
Madaling Mamatay, Mahirap Mabuhay (1996; released under the Neo Films label)
Habang May Buhay (1996)
Tong-Its (1996; released under the Neo Films label)
April Boys: Sana'y Mahalin Mo Rin Ako (1996)
Cara Y Cruz: Walang Sinasanto (1996)
SPO4 Santiago: Sharpshooter (1996)
Takot Ka Ba sa Dilim (1996)
Bilang Na ang Araw Mo (1996; released under the Neo Films label)
Hindi Ako Ander (1996; released under the Neo Films label)
SPO1 Don Juan (Da Dancing Policeman) (1996; released under the Neo Films label)
Mahal Kita, Alam Mo Ba? (1996; released under the Neo Films label)
Do Re Mi (1996; released under the Neo Films label)
Where 'D' Girls 'R''' (1996)Mumbaki (1996; released under the Neo Films label)Ikaw Naman ang Iiyak (1996)Segurista (1996; released under the Neo Films label)Bakit May Kahapon Pa? (1996)Paracale Gang (1996; released under the Falcon Films label)Ober Da Bakod 2 (1996; released under the Neo Films label)Neber 2 Geder (1996)Ang Misis Kong Hoodlum (1996; released under the Neo Films label)Maruja (1996)Wanted: Perfect Mother (1996; released under the Neo Films label)Ang Probinsyano (1996; co-production with FPJ Productions)Papunta Ka Pa Lang, Pabalik Na Ako (1996)TGIS: The Movie (1997)Bridesmaids (1997)Dahil Tanging Ikaw (1997)Magkapalad (1997; released under the Falcon Films label)Nang Iniwan Mo Ako (1997)Trabaho Lang Dear, Walang Personalan (1997; released under the Neo Films label)Lihim ni Madonna (1997)Anak ni Boy Negro (1997; released under the Neo Films label)Laging Naroon Ka (1997)Habang Nasasaktan, Lalong Tumatapang (1997)Nag-Iisang Ikaw (1997; released under the Neo Films label)The Onyok Velasco Story (1997)Hanggang Ngayon Ika'y Minamahal (1997; released under the Neo Films label)Boy Buluran (1997; released under the Neo Films label)Mauna Ka, Susunod Ako (1997)Strict ang Parents Ko (1997; released under the Neo Films label)Hanggang Dito Na Lang (1997)Takot Ako sa Darling Ko (1997; released under the Neo Films label)Gloria, Gloria Labandera (1997)Matinik na Bading, Mga Syokeng Buking (1997; released under the Neo Films label)Pablik Enemi 1 n 2: Aksidental Heroes (1997)Eseng ng Tondo (1997; co-production with FPJ Productions)Isinakdal Ko ang Aking Ina (1997)Hawak Ko Buhay Mo (1997; released under the Neo Films label)Duplikado (1997)Kool Ka Lang (1997; released under the Falcon Films label)Wala Nang Iibigin Pang Iba (1997; released under the Neo Films label)Roberta (1997)Pipti-pipti: 1 Por U, 2 Por Me (1997; released under the Neo Films label)Si Mokong, si Astig, at si Gamol (1997)Isang Tanong, Isang Sagot (1997; released under the Neo Films label)Pag-Ibig Ko Sa Iyo'y Totoo (1997)Nag-iisang Ikaw (1997; released under the Neo Films label)The Sarah Balabagan Story (1997)Wala Na Bang Pag-ibig (1997)Takot Ako sa Darling Ko (1997; released under the Neo Films label)Matinik Na Bading, Mga Syukang Buking (1997; released under the Neo Films label)Extranghero (1997)Magic Kingdom: Ang Alamat ng Damortis (1997; released under the Neo Films label)Ikaw na Sana (1998; released under the Neo Films label)Pagbabalik ng Probinsyano (1998; co-production with FPJ Productions)Strebel: Gestapo ng Maynila (1998)Silaw (1998)Sabong (1998; released under the Falcon Films label)Ben Delubyo (1998; released under the Neo Films label)Ama Namin (1998)Honey, Nasa Langit na Ba Ako? (1998; released under the Neo Films label)It's Cool Bulol (1998; released under the Neo Films label)Pusong Mamon (1998; released under the Neo Films label)Balasubas (1998; released under the Neo Films label)Wangbu (1998; released under the Neo Films label)Dahil Ba sa Kanya (1998)Dr. X on the Air (1998; released under the Falcon Films label)Tatsulok (1998)Kasangga Kahit Kailan (1998; released under the Neo Films label)Ang Lahat ng Ito'y Para Sa'yo (1998)Squala (1998; released under the Neo Films label)Cariño Brutal (1998)Dama de Noche (1998; released under the Neo Films label)I'm Sorry, My Love (1998)Gangland (1998; released under the Neo Films label)Tulak ng Bibig, Kabig ng Dibdib (1998; co-production with FLT Films International)Pagnanasa (1998; released under the Neo Films label)Ginto't Pilak (1998)Warfreak (1998; released under the Neo Films label)Ang Erpat Kong Astig (1998)Sumigaw Ka Hanggang Gusto Mo (1999)Bayad Puri (1999)Scorpio Nights 2 (1999; released under the Neo Films label)My Pledge of Love (1999)Katawan (1999; released under the Neo Films label)Honey, My Love, So Sweet (1999)Ang Kabit ni Mrs. Montero (1999)Ms. Kristina Moran: Babaeng Palaban (1999)Dahil May Isang Ikaw (1999)Basta Ikaw... Nanginginig Pa! (1999; co-production with M-ZET Productions)Warat (1999)Bullet (1999)Ekis: Walang Tatakas (1999)Ikaw Lamang (1999)Bilib Ako Sa 'Yo (1999)Unfaithful Wife 2: Sana'y Huwag Akong Maligaw (1999; co-production with Serafim Productions)Asin at Paminta (1999)Kiss Mo Ko (1999)Dito sa Puso Ko (1999)Linlang (1999)Bulaklak ng Maynila (1999)

2000sMatalino Man ang Matsing, Naiisahan Din (2000)Pag Oras Mo, Oras Mo Na (2000)Mana Mana, Tiba Tiba (2000)Pedro Penduko: Episode II – Return of the Comeback (2000)Bukas Na Lang Kita Mamahalin (2000)Ika-13 Kapitulo (2000)Kailangan Ko'y Ikaw (2000)Biyaheng Langit (2000)Gusto Ko Nang Lumigaya (2000)Abandonada (2000)Juan & Ted: Wanted (2000)Sugo ng Tondo (2000)Balahibong Pusa (2001)Booba (2001)Tusong Twosome (2001)Sa Huling Paghihintay (2001)Abakada... Ina (2001)Baliktaran: Si Ace at si Daisy (2001)Alas Dose (2001)Buhay Kamao (2001)Pangako, Ikaw Lang (2001)Radyo (2001)Banyo Queen (2001)Sanggano't Sanggago (2001)Dos Ekis (2001)Weyt a Minit Kapeng Mainit (2001)Pagdating ng Panahon (2001)Tatarin (2001)Mahal Kita, Final Answer (2002)Ikaw Lamang, Hanggang Ngayon (2002)Hari ng Selda: Anak ni Baby Ama 2 (2002)S2Pid Luv (2002)Akala Mo (2002)Magkapatid (2002)Super B (2002; released under the Neo Films label)D' Uragons (2002)Gamitan (2002)Jeannie, Bakit Ngayon Ka Lang? (2002)Hibla (2002)Sukdulan (2003)A.B. Normal College (2003)Lupe: A Seaman's Wife (2003)Sex Drive (2003)Walang Kapalit (2003)Ang Huling Birhen sa Lupa (2003; released under the Neo Films label)Pangarap Ko ang Ibigin Ka (2003)Masamang Ugat (2003)Keka (2003)First Time (2003)Bugbog Sarado (2003)Captain Barbell (2003; co-production with Premiere Entertainment Productions)Filipinas (2003)Annie B.: Bida ng Ukay-Ukay, Bongga s'ya Day! (2004)Masikip sa Dibdib: The Boobita Rose Story (2004)Kulimlim (2004)Lastikman: Unang Banat (2004)Boso (2005; co-production with Pelipula, released under the Viva Digital label)Tuli (2005)Ilusyon (2005; co-production with Pelipula, released under the Viva Digital label)Kaleldo (2006; distribution only, produced by Centerstage Productions)Co-Ed Scandal (2006; released under the Viva Digital label)Till I Met You (2006; co-production with GMA Pictures)Wag Kang Lilingon (2006; co-production with Star Cinema & ABS-CBN Films)Reyna: Ang Makulay na Pakikipagsapalaran ng Mga Achucherva, Achuchuva, Achechenes... (2006)Siquijor: Mystic Island (2007; distribution only, produced by Centerstage Productions)Ang Cute Ng Ina Mo (2007; co-production with Star Cinema & ABS-CBN Films)Paano Kita Iibigin (2007; co-production with Star Cinema & ABS-CBN Films)Ouija: We Dare You Not to Scream (2007; co-production with GMA Films)Apat Dapat, Dapat Apat: Friends 4 Lyf and Death (2007)When Love Begins (co-production With Star Cinema & ABS-CBN Films, 2008)Ikaw Pa Rin, Bongga Ka Boy! (2008)A Very Special Love (2008; co-production with Star Cinema & ABS-CBN Films)Torotot (2008; co-production with Production 56)Baler (2008; co-production with BIDA)Status: Single (2009)You Changed My Life (2009; co-production with Star Cinema & ABS-CBN Films)Little Boy Big Boy (2009; co-production with Beyond the Box)Patient X'' (2009; co-production with GMA Films)

2010s

2010

2011

2012

2013

2014

2015

2016

2017

2018

2019

2020s

2020

2021

2022

2023

Distribution

Upcoming films

Color key

References

External links
List of Viva Films Movies at IMDB.Com

 
Lists of Philippine films